The canton of La Plaine Niortaise is an administrative division of the Deux-Sèvres department, western France. It was created at the French canton reorganisation which came into effect in March 2015. Its seat is in Chauray.

It consists of the following communes:
 
Aiffres
Brûlain
Chauray
Échiré
Juscorps
Prahecq
Saint-Gelais
Saint-Martin-de-Bernegoue
Saint-Romans-des-Champs
Vouillé

References

Cantons of Deux-Sèvres